William Yates Peel (3 August 1789 – 1 June 1858), was a British Tory politician.

Peel was the second son of Sir Robert Peel, 1st Baronet, and his first wife Ellen (née Yates). He was the younger brother of Prime Minister Sir Robert Peel, 2nd Baronet, and the elder brother of Jonathan Peel. He was educated at Harrow and St John's College, Cambridge. Peel sat as Member of Parliament for Bossiney from 1817 to 1818, for Tamworth from 1818 to 1830, 1835 to 1837 and in 1847, for Yarmouth from 1830 to 1831 and for Cambridge University from 1831 to 1832 and served under the Duke of Wellington as Under-Secretary of State for the Home Department from 1828 to 1830 and as a Lord of the Treasury under Wellington in 1830 and again under his brother Sir Robert Peel from 1834 to 1835. In 1834 he was admitted to the Privy Council.

Family
Peel married Lady Jane Elizabeth Moore, daughter of Stephen Moore, 2nd Earl Mount Cashell and his wife Margaret King, on 8 July 1819 at St Marylebone Parish Church, London. They had six sons and ten daughters, all bar two sons survived childhood.

Robert Moore Peel (1820–17 October 1878)
Ellen Peel (b. 1821)
William Yates Peel (1822–20 January 1879)
Edmund Peel (b. cir 1823, died young)
Elizabeth Peel (b. 4 May 1824)
Jane Peel (b. 14 July 1825)
Julia Augusta Peel (b. 13 July 1826)
Matilda Katherine Peel (b. 8 July 1827)
Alice Anne Peel (b. 10 July 1828)
Adelaide Elizabeth Peel (b. 10 July 1828)
Henry Peel (b. 1 October 1829, died young)
Octavia Peel (b. 1830)
Emily Peel (b. 15 December 1831)
Frederick Peel (16 August 1833 – 31 March 1915) – father of Arthur Peel (diplomat)
Francis Peel (1835–3 September 1894) – the father of Robert Francis Peel
Flora Jane Peel (2 March 1837 – 1876)

Jane Elizabeth died in Warwickshire in 1847. Peel survived her by eleven years and died at his residence in Baginton Hall, Warwickshire in June 1858, aged 68.

References

Sources

External links

 

´

1789 births
1858 deaths
People educated at Harrow School
Alumni of St John's College, Cambridge
Members of the Privy Council of the United Kingdom
Members of the Parliament of the United Kingdom for English constituencies
Members of the Parliament of the United Kingdom for the University of Cambridge
UK MPs 1812–1818
UK MPs 1818–1820
UK MPs 1820–1826
UK MPs 1826–1830
UK MPs 1830–1831
UK MPs 1831–1832
UK MPs 1847–1852
Younger sons of baronets
Members of the Parliament of the United Kingdom for constituencies in Cornwall
William